Neoregelia wilsoniana is a species of flowering plant in the genus Neoregelia.

Cultivars 
 Neoregelia 'B.J. Hall'
 Neoregelia 'Black Bandit'
 Neoregelia 'Butternut'
 Neoregelia 'Doofus'
 Neoregelia 'Gillian'
 Neoregelia 'Golden Boy'
 Neoregelia 'Golden Chalice'
 Neoregelia 'Humdinger'
 Neoregelia 'Joybringer'
 Neoregelia 'Kore'
 Neoregelia 'Olly Wilson'
 Neoregelia 'Persephone'
 Neoregelia 'Sara's Sunset'
 × Niduregelia 'Anson'

References 
BSI Cultivar Registry Retrieved 11 October 2009

wilsoniana